Periphery is the debut studio album by American progressive metal band Periphery. It was released on April 20, 2010 through  Sumerian Records, and was produced by the band themselves and Matt Murphy. Many songs on the tracklist had been written long before the release date—with some written by original lead vocalist Casey Sabol—but due to membership changes, the album was postponed on several occasions. Former vocalist Chris Barretto had nearly finished recording the album before he and the band parted ways months before its release. Rather than release the songs with Barretto's vocals, the band decided to rerecord Barretto's songs with Spencer Sotelo; however, Sotelo only re-worked a few of the melodies when recording vocals, versus writing completely new lyrics. As a result, Sabol's and Barretto's lyrics and vocal melodies and harmonies are still featured on the record. The album was re-released on February 6, 2012 as a 'Special Edition' including instrumentals, along with a new song "Passenger", originally recorded by guitarist Mark Holcomb during his time in the band Haunted Shores. This is the only album to feature guitarist Alex Bois and bassist Tom Murphy.

Critical reception

A writer for AbsolutePunk said that despite Sotelo's "frog-like" screams being weak throughout the track listing, the record contains solid lyricism and musicianship that add support to Sotelo's singing, concluding that "From beginning to end, Periphery's self titled debut is a wonder to behold, and in my mind, will inspire modern metal for the next decade, and with the sincerity, originality, and technical abilities of this band, that can only be a good thing." Gregory Heaney of AllMusic praised the band for constructing a mixture of "blistering fretwork, extreme tunings, and studio magic" that's reminiscent of Meshuggah and The Dillinger Escape Plan without sounding overproduced, concluding that "By pushing the production to such limits, the album manages to blast through the typical production clichés to create a sonic assault […] making Periphery an album that'll give lovers of prog metal something to sink their teeth into." Richard Cartey of Rock Sound admired the band's unique amalgam of "steady lyrical patterns" through a "polyrhythmic maze" to craft their own blueprint of progressive metal but pointed out their overreliance on mimicking fellow band Sikth to attain that creative spark, concluding with, "Though there are some remarkably beautiful sections, ultimately Periphery’s palette is limited and struggles to support itself for all 73 minutes. Still, a laudably bold statement."

Track listing

Notes
 An instrumental version was released through the iTunes Store.
 "Ragtime Dandies" also appears at the end of "Icarus Lives!" on the CD version.
 "Captain On" and "Eureka!" were included on the Icarus EP.
 "Passenger" was released on February 21, 2012 as a digital-single via iTunes.

Outtakes
The following tracks were cut from the final album.
 Not Enough Mana
 Absolomb (later included on Periphery III)
 Far Out (later included on Periphery II as a bonus track)
 Project 15

Personnel
 Spencer Sotelo – lead vocals
 Misha "Bulb" Mansoor – guitar, programming, producer
 Jake Bowen – guitar, programming
 Alex Bois – guitar, backing vocals
 Tom Murphy – bass, backing vocals
 Matt Halpern – drums, percussion

Guest appearances
 Adam 'Nolly' Getgood – guitar solo (on "Totla Mad")
 Jeff Loomis – guitar solo (on "Racecar")
 Elliot Coleman – vocals (on "Racecar")

Production
 Misha Mansoor – producer, mixing, mastering
 Matt Murphy – vocal recording, producer
 Benjamin Guarino – album artwork, layout and design

Charts

References

2010 debut albums
Periphery (band) albums
Sumerian Records albums
Distort Entertainment albums
Roadrunner Records albums